Michael "Mike" Wheeler is a fictional character from the Netflix science fiction horror series Stranger Things. He is one of the central characters in the series, acting as the leader of the main group of kids. Mike is portrayed by Finn Wolfhard.

Casting and concept 

Noah Schnapp originally auditioned to play Mike in the show. Mike was designed by series creators Matt and Ross Duffer to be a prototypical 80s main character who is loyal and energetic while also innocent due to his young age. His progression through the show was a coming of age arc that is also similar to other 80s TV shows and movies that the Duffer brothers used as inspiration.

Fictional character biography

Season 1 

At the beginning of the series, Mike is playing Dungeons & Dragons with his best friends, Dustin Henderson (Gaten Matarazzo), Lucas Sinclair (Caleb McLaughlin), and Will Byers (Noah Schnapp) on November 6, 1983. That night, Will mysteriously disappears. The next day, Mike, Dustin, and Lucas find a girl with a shaved head named Eleven (Millie Bobby Brown). They take Eleven back to Mike's house and hide her in his basement. Later, Will's corpse is apparently found in a local quarry, but the boys are convinced that Will is alive and in a parallel dimension, which they call the “Upside Down”.   

When an assembly for Will is held at school, the boys and Eleven witness school bullies Troy and James snickering during a staff member’s speech, angering Mike. At the end of the assembly, Mike confronts the bullies, and pushes Troy. This leads Troy to retaliate, but he stops in his tracks. He then begins to urinate, to the amusement of the students; this is revealed to be the work of Eleven, who walks away before she is suspected.   

After Will's funeral, the boys ask their science teacher, Mr. Clarke, about alternate dimensions. Mr. Clarke tells them that a gate to another dimension would have, among other things, a strong electromagnetic field. The boys then figure out that they can use a compass to find the gate, and thus Will. However, after looking for Will for hours, the boys find out that Eleven is tampering with their compasses to keep them from going to Hawkins National Laboratory. Eleven accidentally knocks Lucas unconscious after he attacks Mike, and runs away from the boys after Mike and Dustin express their shock.  

Later, while looking for Eleven, Mike and Dustin are attacked by Troy and James in retribution for the incident at the assembly. Troy grabs Dustin and threatens to maim him if Mike doesn't jump off a nearby cliff. To the bullies’ surprise and Dustin’s horror, Mike jumps; however, he is saved and pulled to safety by an unseen force, which is revealed to be Eleven. After injuring the bullies and forcing them to flee, Eleven apologizes to Mike and Dustin, who reassure her and reaffirm their friendship.  

The group eventually build a makeshift sensory deprivation tank at Hawkins Middle School to allow Eleven to amplify her powers to find Will. While at the school, Mike asks Eleven to a school dance, and the two share their first kiss. Soon after, government forces enter the school and attempt to recapture Eleven. After subduing the agents, Eleven focuses her attention on the entity responsible for Will’s disappearance, a monstrous creature nicknamed the “Demogorgon.” She telekinetically holds the Demogorgon to a wall and expends the last of her energy to annihilate it, making both her and the creature disappear. Mike and his friends call for Eleven, but to no avail. This leads them to believe that she is truly gone; this particularly affects Mike, who longs to see Eleven once again.

Season 2

Dustin and Lucas become infatuated with new student Maxine "Max" Mayfield (Sadie Sink) and attempt to get her to join their group. Mike disagrees and abandons Dustin, Lucas, and Max on Halloween Night. The next day at school, Dustin reveals the new creature he discovered which he calls D'Artagnan. After seeing the creature, Will confides to Mike that the creature is from the Upside Down. At the same time as Mike confronts his feelings towards Max, Will undergoes an episode where he is possessed by "the Mind Flayer." Mike and Will witness Hawkins Lab agents torching parts of the Upside-Down from underground tunnels, causing Will to begin screaming and convulsing on the ground. Will is then taken to Hawkins Lab so he can be treated. After they escape Demodogs at Hawkins Lab, they reunite with Dustin, Lucas, Max, Nancy, Will's brother Jonathan (Charlie Heaton) and Nancy's ex-boyfriend Steve Harrington (Joe Keery). 

The Byers house is surrounded by Demodogs and Eleven arrives and eradicates them. Mike is relieved that Eleven is alive. She leaves to close the gate at Hawkins Lab. The group enter the tunnels and douse the hub with gasoline. Months after Eleven closes the gate to the Upside Down, Mike attends the school Snow Ball with Eleven, leading to the two sharing a dance and a kiss.

Season 3

Mike and Eleven have been dating for seven months. Both of them keep kissing all the time, much to the dismay of Eleven's adoptive father, Jim Hopper. An annoyed Jim threatens Mike not to meet El regularly and will end their relationship if Mike disagrees. This leads Mike to lie to Eleven and she later breaks up with him. Mike and Will have an argument where Mike says, "It's not my fault you don't like girls." Will reveals to his friends that he has been sensing the Mind Flayer. The group attempt to figure out how to get rid of the Mind Flayer for good and travel to Eleven and Hopper's house where Mike blurts out that he loves her and cannot lose her again. Eleven finds the Mind Flayer and Mike attempts to share his feelings with Eleven, but is interrupted by Dustin, who calls Mike on his walkie-talkie saying that he is in danger, but is unable to give his location before the batteries run out. Eleven finds him and his group at Starcourt Mall.

Mike, Lucas, and Will reconcile with Dustin. Mike, Eleven, and Max are separated from everybody else; they manage to hide before Lucas, Will, Nancy, and Jonathan distract the Mind Flayer.  Billy finds Mike, Eleven, and Max on his own. He knocks Mike and Max unconscious, and brings Eleven to the center of the mall, where the Mind Flayer has returned. Mike and Max regain consciousness to see the Mind Flayer about to kill Eleven, but Billy sacrifices his life to save Eleven. Joyce and Hopper close the gate. Three months later a now powerless Eleven, who has been living with the Byers, prepares to move out of Hawkins. Eleven tells Mike that she loves him and the two share a kiss before promising to visit each other during Thanksgiving.

Season 4

Mike is now part of Hellfire, a Dungeons and Dragons club at his school, alongside Dustin and Lucas, which is run by Eddie Munson. He visits Eleven and Will in California where Eleven claims to be happy and Mike disparages Will when he explains that Eleven is being bullied. The two then witness Eleven assault her main bully and get arrested. She is then intercepted by Dr. Sam Owens and taken to the NINA project. Mike joins Will, Jonathan, and Argyle to find Eleven after the US army attacks the house, and Suzie, Dustin's girlfriend, helps them find the coordinates for NINA. Will shows Mike a painting of the group fighting a dragon and tells Mike that he makes Eleven not feel like a mistake and that the painting was her idea, but when Mike is not paying attention Will breaks down crying. They all reunite with Eleven and help her telepathically fight Vecna using an isolation tank, and when she struggles, Mike helps her overpower Vecna by telling her he loves her. Mike then returns to Hawkins where he reunites with his family before Will senses a presence and they all discover the Upside Down infiltrating Hawkins.

Reception

While ranking the characters in the show, Evan Romano of Men's Health said that Mike is "a really great character and is a blast to watch on the screen." In a review for season 3 of Stranger Things, Judy Berman of Time said Wolfhard gets "better every season." Darren Franich of Entertainment Weekly enjoyed the transition of Mike from a child to a teenager in the third season. Ritwik Mitra of Screen Rant said of Wolfhard: "the character he portrays is one of the best parts of the show" and that "from teenage angst to developing a protective mindset — Mike is definitely a model child in every way and a great part of the show."  Liz Shannon Miller, Steve Greene, Hanh Nguyen, Ben Travers of IndieWire said that "his...tenacity to keep ...is a credit to his character. It’s no wonder that he’s the one whom Will confides in and that attempts to fight off the Mind Flayer. Mike’s just a good guy to have in your corner, no matter what the circumstances." BuzzFeed said that he "really had a great thought process when it came to helping his friends and taking down the Mind Flayer."

References

American male characters in television
Child characters in television
Fictional characters from Indiana
Fictional middle school students
Horror television characters
Science fiction television characters
Stranger Things characters
Television characters introduced in 2016